Belarus competed at the 2008 European Track Championships in Pruszków, Poland, from 3 September to 7 September 2008. Belarus registered a team of 12 men and  8 women.

List of medalists

See also

  Great Britain at the 2008 UEC European Track Championships
  Lithuania at the 2008 UEC European Track Championships
  Netherlands at the 2008 UEC European Track Championships

References

2008 in Belarusian sport
Cycle racing in Belarus
Nations at the 2008 UEC European Track Championships